Pease Dean is a nature reserve at Pease Bay, in the Scottish Borders area of Scotland, near the Anglo-Scottish border and Cockburnspath, Cove, and Dunglass. OS 67 NT794707.

The reserve is managed by the Scottish Wildlife Trust and has two parts: Pease Burn and Tower Burn. Pease Burn is open grassland, with gorse and alder. Tower Burn consists of mixed woodland.

Pease Bridge
In 18th century Europe, Pease Bridge was the highest bridge of its kind in the world, built in 1786.

See also
List of Sites of Special Scientific Interest in Tweeddale and Ettrick and Lauderdale
List of Sites of Special Scientific Interest in Berwickshire and Roxburgh
Scottish Wildlife Trust
Southern Upland Way
List of places in the Scottish Borders

References

External links
WalkingScotland: Pease Dean, Cockburnspath
Map of Pease Dean Nature Reserve
Sir Water Scott Way: Pease Dean, Pease Bridge
RCAHMS/Canmore: record for Cockburnspath, Pease Bridge
GEOGRAPH: Pease Dean Woodland
GEOGRAPH: Pease Dean, footbridge over the Heriot Water

Nature reserves in Scotland
Protected areas in the Scottish Borders